Tasty Bite is an Indian-American preserved food manufacturer, producing ready-to-eat Indian and pan-Asian food products. The products require no cooking, contain no preservatives, and require no refrigeration.  

Tasty Bite was founded in 1996. Its products are available in every state in the U.S. and are sold in most American grocery chains. In August 2017, a majority of the owner company of Tasty Bite was acquired by Mars, Incorporated.

Products

Indian and Southern Asian dishes (Entrees) 

 Agra Peas & Greens
 Aloo Palak
 Bangkok Beans
 Bengal Lentils
 Bombay Potatoes
 Chana Masala
 Jaipur Vegetables
 Jodhpur Lentils
 Kashmir Spinach
 Kerala Vegetables
 Madras Lentils
 Malaysian Lodeh
 Peas Paneer
 Punjab Eggplant
 Spinach Chana
 Spinach Dal
 Tofu Corn Masala
 Vegetable Korma

Ready To Eat Rice
 Basmati Rice
 Brown Rice
 Garlic Brown Rice
 Ginger Lentil Rice
 Jasmine Rice
 Tandoori Rice
 Tehari Herb Rice
 Thai Lime Rice

Thai and Asian Noodles (Noodles) 
 Pad Thai
 Toasted Sesame
 Thai Basil
 Mushroom Lo Mein
 Kung Pao
 Lemongrass Ginger

Meal Inspirations
 Barley Medley
 Chunky Chickpeas
 Lentil Magic
 Zany Multigrain
 Zesty Lentils & Peas

Packaging
Tasty Bite meals are sealed in a multi-layer retort pouch and have a shelf life of up to 18 months. During the manufacturing process, the pouches are filled with food, sealed, and cooked in a retort oven under high temperature and pressure. The pouches are BPA-free. Tasty Bite products are manufactured at its Bhandgaon plant in India. The vegetables used are grown on a private farm owned and managed by the company.

References

External links
 Official site
 (The Hindu Business Line) Tasty Bite plans foray into curry pastes

Brand name snack foods